These are the squads for the national teams participated in the II Mundialito de Seniors held in Brazil, in 1989. The tournament was played in a round robin format with Brazil being the winners of this first edition.

Group

Head coach: Luciano do Valle

Head coach:

Head coach:

Head coach:

Head coach:

References

http://www.rsssfbrasil.com/sel/brazil198795mr.htm
http://www.rsssf.com/tablesp/pele-wc.html
http://elpais.com/diario/1987/01/04/deportes/536713215_850215.html
http://trivela.uol.com.br/quando-luciano-valle-treinou-selecao-de-pele-rivellino-zico-e-dinamite/ 
http://www.football-the-story.com/copa-pele-coupe-du-monde-des-veterans
http://lucarne-opposee.fr/index.php/culture-foot/4717-la-copa-pele-l-autre-coupe-du-monde

World Cup of Masters events
1989
1989 in Brazilian football